The 1900 United States presidential election in Arkansas took place on November 6, 1900. All contemporary 45 states were part of the 1900 United States presidential election. Voters chose eight electors to the Electoral College, which selected the president and vice president.

Arkansas was won by the Democratic nominees, former U.S. Representative William Jennings Bryan of Nebraska and his running mate Adlai Stevenson I of Illinois.

Results

Results by county

See also
 United States presidential elections in Arkansas

Notes

References

Arkansas
1900
1900 Arkansas elections